Fort Smith National Historic Site is a National Historic Site located in Fort Smith, Arkansas, along the Arkansas River. The first fort at this site was established by the United States in 1817, before this area was established as part of Indian Territory. It was later replaced and the second fort was operated by the US until 1871. This site was designated as a National Historic Landmark in 1961.

The fort was the first site of the United States District Court for the Western District of Arkansas, which had jurisdiction over western Arkansas and all of Indian Territory. It began operations in 1875 with the appointment of Isaac C. Parker as the first federal district judge here. The town of Fort Smith, Arkansas developed around the fort.

Description

The site includes the second historic fort constructed at this place. In addition, located on the grounds are the foundation remains of the first Fort Smith (1817–1824), the commissary building (c. 1838) and a reconstruction of the gallows used by the federal court. A walking trail along the Arkansas River includes wayside exhibits on the Trail of Tears.

Congress authorized acquisition of land on the Oklahoma bank of the Arkansas River to be included in the National Historic Site, in order to preserve a historic viewshed, but it has not been acquired.

The park visitor center is now located in the old Barracks/Courthouse/Jail building. Exhibits in the visitor center focus on Fort Smith's military history from 1817 to 1871, its role in the western expansion of the United States, Federal District Judge Isaac Parker and the federal court's effects on justice in Indian Territory, the U.S. Deputy Marshals and outlaws, Federal Indian policy, and Indian Removal, including the Cherokee Trail of Tears.

History
The site was established in 1961 in order to protect the remains of two 19th-century U.S. military forts, including a building that once housed the United States District Court for the Western District of Arkansas, which had jurisdiction over federal cases in Indian Territory. Fort Smith was also notable as a major stop for the Choctaw and Cherokee people along the "Trail of Tears." during the period of Indian Removal from the Southeast.  It was designated a National Historic Landmark in 1961.

The original fort was established on December 25, 1817, by Major William Bradford in order to maintain harmony between the local Osage Indians, who had long been dominant in this territory, and a band of Cherokee who had migrated west, under pressure from European Americans, from their traditional territory in the Southeast. This time would later be historically referenced as the "First Fort." It ended in 1824 when the U.S. Army abandoned Fort Smith after constructing Fort Gibson further west.

As a result of the increased tensions Indians following the Indian Removal Act of 1830, and local white settlers who encroached on their territory, the U.S. Army created a second Fort Smith in 1838 near the original's ruins. This is the beginning of the historical "Second Fort" period. During General Zachary Taylor's command of the fort in the 1840s, it became a supply depot for other forts within the Indian Territory. It was captured during the Civil War from Confederate forces in 1863 by Union troops. The majority of the Cherokee and other Five Civilized Tribes had initially allied with the Confederacy, and supplied warriors to its forces. The fort continued in use as a supply depot to other forts in the region until it was no longer occupied in an official capacity by 1871; historically the end of the "Second Fort" era.

As often happened, a small town developed around the fort, with people attracted for business. In addition, court operations continued at a courthouse built in town for the United States District Court for the Western District of Arkansas, which presided over the western half of Arkansas and all of Indian Territory. It was first held at the fort, as noted above. The first federal district judge here was Isaac C. Parker, who presided over the court from 1875 to 1896.

Image gallery

See also
Indian Council at Fort Smith
List of National Historic Landmarks in Arkansas
National Register of Historic Places listings in Sebastian County, Arkansas

References

External links

1961 establishments in Arkansas
Arkansas in the American Civil War
Arkansas Heritage Trails System
Buildings and structures in Fort Smith, Arkansas
Smith
History museums in Arkansas
Smith
National Historic Landmarks in Arkansas
National Historic Sites in Arkansas
Native American history of Arkansas
Native American history of Oklahoma
Museums in Sebastian County, Arkansas
National Register of Historic Places in Sebastian County, Arkansas
Pre-statehood history of Arkansas
Protected areas established in 1961
Protected areas of Sebastian County, Arkansas
Stagecoach stops in the United States
Trail of Tears